John Patrick Boylan II (born March 21, 1941) is an American record producer and songwriter.

Career
Boylan grew up in Buffalo, New York. Upon graduating from Bard College, he and his brother Terence Boylan worked with music publisher Charles Koppelman in Tin Pan Alley before moving to Los Angeles in the late 1960s. There they recorded an album as the Appletree Theatre.  After a stint as one-third of the group Hamilton Streetcar (with Buzz Clifford of "Baby Sittin' Boogie" fame, and original group member Ralph Plummer – the group was originally named on behalf of former member John Burge, aka Ian Hamilton) which in 1969 recorded a self-titled album for Dot Records (Dot: DLP25939), John then started to develop a career as a producer, working with Ricky Nelson, the Association, the Dillards, Presence and others.  He also managed Linda Ronstadt – in particular, introducing her to a then unknown group of musicians who went on to become her backing band in 1971, and later became the Eagles.

After working in the early 1970s with Pure Prairie League and Commander Cody, he had one of his biggest successes sharing the production duties of the first Boston album with the band's founder Tom Scholz. The group's label, Epic Records, rewarded him by offering him the position of Vice President, West Coast, where he stayed for a decade. During this period, he produced many further successful albums, notably with Charlie Daniels, Mickey Gilley and the Little River Band. In 1986, he left to form his own company, Great Eastern Music. One of his first projects was to produce the album The Simpsons Sing the Blues.

Boylan's new passion in producing children's music resulted in albums by The Chipmunks and the Muppets. In 1998, he produced the ABC-TV prime time special Elmopalooza, and the soundtrack for which he won the 1999 Grammy Award for Best Musical Album for Children. He was also pivotal around this time in launching Sheila Nicholls' career in music. After hearing a demo from her NYC band, Splendidfrock, he executive-produced and provided the raw materials for her to record her first album Brief Strop. He has also worked on several motion picture soundtracks, including Urban Cowboy and Born on the Fourth of July.

Boylan is a professor teaching critical listening skills and music business-audio careers for the Citrus College Recording Arts program in Glendora, California.

References

External links
John Boylan Interview NAMM Oral History Library (2003)

Living people
Record producers from California
1941 births
Bard College alumni
Grammy Award winners
Citrus College people